George Teasdale (8 December 1831 – 9 June 1907) was a Mormon missionary and a member of the Quorum of the Twelve Apostles of the Church of Jesus Christ of Latter-day Saints (LDS Church).

Teasdale was born in London, England. Teasdale was baptized into the LDS Church on 8 August 1852, after learning about the church from a Mormon co-worker.

In 1853, Teasdale married Emily Emma Brown, a member of the LDS Church. In 1857, Teasdale became a full-time church missionary in England and Scotland. In 1859, he became the supervisor of the missionaries in Scotland. In 1861, Teasdale was released as a missionary and he and his wife emigrated to Utah Territory.

In Utah, Teasdale taught school and was a member of the Mormon Tabernacle Choir. In 1868–69, he returned to England as a missionary to help British Latter-day Saints migrate to Utah. His wife died in 1874, after he had fathered seven children by her, five of whom died in infancy. The couple had been monogamous, but after Emily's death, he had four more recorded marriages, and possibly as many as 10 more, all without issue. In 1875, he served a mission to Tennessee, North Carolina and Virginia. He became president of the church's Juab Stake.

Teasdale was ordained an apostle on 16 October 1882, by church president John Taylor. Future church president, Heber J. Grant, was ordained an apostle on the same date. Teasdale immediately served a six-month mission to the Indian Territory.

As an apostle, Teasdale served another mission for the church from 1887 to 1890 and he preached in the United Kingdom, France, Switzerland, Germany, Denmark, Sweden, Norway, and Ireland.

In 1891, Teasdale became president of the church's Mexican Mission.

Teasdale died in Salt Lake City at age 75 of an intestinal obstruction. He was buried at Salt Lake City Cemetery and was succeeded in the Quorum of the Twelve by Anthony W. Ivins.

Notes

Further reading
 

1831 births
1907 deaths
19th-century Mormon missionaries
American Latter Day Saints
Apostles (LDS Church)
British Latter Day Saints
British expatriates in Mexico
Burials at Salt Lake City Cemetery
Clergy from London
Converts to Mormonism
Deaths from bowel obstruction
English Mormon missionaries
English emigrants to the United States
English general authorities (LDS Church)
Mission presidents (LDS Church)
Mormon missionaries in Denmark
Mormon missionaries in France
Mormon missionaries in Germany
Mormon missionaries in Ireland
Mormon missionaries in Mexico
Mormon missionaries in Norway
Mormon missionaries in Sweden
Mormon missionaries in Switzerland
Mormon missionaries in the United Kingdom
Mormon missionaries in the United States
Tabernacle Choir members